Christian Gálvez may refer to:

 Christian Gálvez (footballer) (born 1979), Chilean football defender
 Christian Gálvez (TV presenter) (born 1980), Spanish television presenter and writer